Antonio González Acevedo (died 14 March 1642) was a Roman Catholic prelate who served as Bishop of Coria (1637–1642) and Bishop of Almería (1633–1637).

Biography
Antonio González Acevedo was ordained a priest on 17 December 1605.
On 19 December 1633, he was appointed during the papacy of Pope Urban VIII as Bishop of Almería.
On 2 April 1634, he was consecrated bishop by Miguel Avellán, Titular Bishop of Siriensis, with Timoteo Pérez Vargas, Bishop of Ispahan, and Cristóforo Chrisostome Carletti, Bishop of Termia, serving as co-consecrators. 
On 5 October 1637, he was appointed during the papacy of Pope Urban VIII as Bishop of Coria.
He served as Bishop of Coria until his death on 14 March 1642.

While bishop, he was the principal co-consecrator of Juan Vélez de Valdivielso, Bishop of Lugo (1636).

References

External links and additional sources
 (for Chronology of Bishops) 
 (for Chronology of Bishops) 

17th-century Roman Catholic bishops in Spain
Bishops appointed by Pope Urban VIII
1642 deaths